The H. M. Wilson is a tugboat especially designed for service in Churchill, Manitoba, the only Arctic Ocean port connected to the North America railroad grid.

The vessel was designed by the well-known naval architectural firm, Robert Allan Ltd.

She was designed to be broken down into several loads that could each be shipped on a railroad flatcar, to be reassembled in Churchill.

She was designed with a relatively flat bottom, due to the lack of any nearby ports with maintenance facilities.  When her hull needs to be serviced or inspected, she beaches herself.

She is equipped with a water cannon, for fighting fires.

She was built to operate in icy waters.

See also
 George Kydd

References

Tugboats of Canada
Water transport in Manitoba
1985 ships